Nantucket is an island about  south from Cape Cod. Together with the small islands of Tuckernuck and Muskeget, it constitutes the Town and County of Nantucket, a combined county/town government that is part of the U.S. state of Massachusetts. It is the only such consolidated town-county in Massachusetts. As of the 2020 census, the population was 14,255, making it the least populated county in Massachusetts. Part of the town is designated the Nantucket CDP, or census-designated place. The region of Surfside on Nantucket is the southernmost settlement in Massachusetts.

The name "Nantucket" is adapted from similar Algonquian names for the island, but is very similar to the endonym of the native Nehantucket tribe that occupied the region at the time of European settlement.

Nantucket is a tourist destination and summer colony. Due to tourists and seasonal residents, the population of the island increases to at least 50,000 during the summer months. The average sale price for a single-family home was $2.3 million in the first quarter of 2018.

The National Park Service cites Nantucket, designated a National Historic Landmark District in 1966, as being the "finest surviving architectural and environmental example of a late 18th- and early 19th-century New England seaport town."  

Nantucket is accessible by boat, ferry, or airplane.

History

Etymology
Nantucket probably takes its name from a Wampanoag word, transliterated variously as natocke, nantaticu, nantican, nautica or natockete, which is part of Wampanoag lore about the creation of Martha's Vineyard and Nantucket. The meaning of the term is uncertain, although according to the Encyclopædia Britannica it may have meant "far away island" or "sandy, sterile soil tempting no one". Wampanoag is an Eastern Algonquian language of southern New England. The Nehantucket (known to Europeans as the Niantic) were an Algonquin-speaking people of the area.

Nantucket's nickname, "The Little Grey Lady of the Sea", refers to the island as it appears from the ocean when it is fog-bound.

European colonization
The earliest European settlement in the region was established on the neighboring island of Martha's Vineyard by the English-born merchant Thomas Mayhew. In 1641, Thomas secured Martha's Vineyard, Nantucket, the Elizabeth Islands, and other islands in the region as a proprietary colony from Sir Ferdinando Gorges and the Earl of Sterling. Thomas led several families to settle the region, establishing several treaties with the indigenous inhabitants of Nantucket, the Wampanoag people. These treaties helped prevent the region from becoming embroiled in King Philip's War. The growing population of settlers welcomed seasonal groups of other Native American tribes who traveled to the island to fish and later harvest whales that washed up on shore. Nantucket was officially part of Dukes County, New York, until 17 October 1691, when the charter for the newly formed Province of Massachusetts Bay was signed. Following the arrival of the new Royal Governor on 14 May 1692 to effectuate the new government, Nantucket County was partitioned from Dukes County, Massachusetts in 1695.

Nantucket settlers
In October 1641, William Alexander, the Earl of Stirling, deeded the island to Thomas Mayhew of Watertown, Massachusetts. In 1659, Mayhew sold an interest in the island to nine other purchasers, reserving one-tenth of an interest for himself, "for the sum of thirty pounds ... and also two beaver hats, one for myself, and one for my wife".

Each of the ten original owners was allowed to invite one partner. There is some confusion about the identity of the first twenty owners, partly because William Pile did not choose a partner and sold his interest to Richard Swain, which was subsequently divided between John Bishop and the children of George Bunker.

Anxious to add to their number and to induce tradesmen to come to the island, the total number of shares were increased to twenty-seven. The original purchasers needed the assistance of tradesmen who were skilled in the arts of weaving, milling, building and other pursuits and selected men who were given half a share provided that they lived on Nantucket and carried on their trade for at least three years.

By 1667, twenty-seven shares had been divided among 31 owners.

European settlement of Nantucket did not begin in earnest until 1659, when Thomas Mayhew sold his interest to a group of investors, led by Tristram Coffin. The "nine original purchasers" were Tristram Coffin, Peter Coffin, Thomas Macy, Christopher Hussey, Richard Swain, Thomas Barnard, Stephen Greenleaf, John Swain and William Pile. These men are considered the founding fathers of Nantucket, and many islanders are related to these families. Seamen and tradesmen began to populate Nantucket, such as Richard Gardner (arrived 1667) and Capt. John Gardner (arrived 1672), sons of Thomas Gardner. The first settlers focused on farming and raising sheep, but overgrazing and the growing number of farms made these activities untenable, and the islanders soon began turning to the sea for a living.

Before 1795, the town on the island was called Sherburne. The original settlement was near Capaum Pond. At that time, the pond was a small harbor whose entrance silted up, forcing the settlers to dismantle their houses and move them northeast by two miles to the present location. On June 8, 1795, the bill proposed by Micajah Coffin to change the town's name to the "Town of Nantucket" was endorsed and signed by Governor Samuel Adams to officially change the town name.

The whaling industry

In his 1835 history of Nantucket Island, Obed Macy wrote that in the early pre-1672 colony, a whale of the kind called "scragg" entered the harbor and was pursued and killed by the settlers. This event started the Nantucket whaling industry. A. B. Van Deinse points out that the "scrag whale", described by P. Dudley in 1725 as one of the species hunted by early New England whalers, was almost certainly the gray whale, which has flourished on the west coast of North America in modern times with protection from whaling.

In the beginning of the 17th century, whaling on Nantucket was usually done from small boats launched from the island's shores, which would tow killed whales to be processed on the beach. These boats were only about seven meters long, with mostly Wampanoag manpower, sourced from a system of debt servitude established by English Nantucketers—a typical boat's crew had five Wampanoag oarsmen and a single white Nantucketer at the steering oar. Author Nathaniel Philbrick notes that "without the native population, which outnumbered the white population well into the 1720s, the island would never have become a successful whaling port."

Nantucket's dependence on trade with Britain, derived from its whaling and supporting industries, influenced its leading citizens to remain neutral during the American Revolutionary War, favoring neither the British nor the Patriots.

Herman Melville commented on Nantucket's whaling dominance in Moby-Dick, Chapter 14: "Two thirds of this terraqueous globe are the Nantucketer's. For the sea is his; he owns it, as Emperors own empires". The Moby-Dick characters Ahab and Starbuck are both from Nantucket. The tragedy that inspired Melville to write his novel Moby-Dick was the final voyage of the Nantucket whaler Essex.

The fire left hundreds homeless and poverty-stricken, and many people left the island. By 1850, whaling was in decline, as Nantucket's whaling industry had been surpassed by that of New Bedford. Another contributor to the decline was the silting up of the harbor, which prevented large whaling ships from entering and leaving the port, unlike New Bedford, which still owned a deep water port. In addition, the development of railroads made mainland whaling ports, such as New Bedford, more attractive because of the ease of transshipment of whale oil onto trains, an advantage unavailable to an island. The American Civil War dealt the death blow to the island's whaling industry, as virtually all of the remaining whaling vessels were destroyed by Confederate commerce raiders.

Later history
As a result of this depopulation, the island was left under-developed and isolated until the mid-20th century. The isolation kept many of the pre-Civil War buildings intact and, by the 1950s, enterprising developers began buying up large sections of the island and restoring them to create an upmarket destination for wealthy people in the Northeastern United States.

Nantucket and towns on Martha's Vineyard contemplated seceding from the Commonwealth of Massachusetts, which they considered at various town meetings in 1977, unsuccessfully. The votes were sparked by a proposed change to the Massachusetts Constitution that would have reduced the size of the state's House of Representatives from 240 to 160 members and would therefore reduce the islands' representation in the Massachusetts General Court.

Geology and geography

It is the smallest county in Massachusetts by land area and second-smallest by total area. The triangular region of ocean between Nantucket, Martha's Vineyard, and Cape Cod is Nantucket Sound.

Nantucket was formed by the outermost reach of the Laurentide Ice Sheet during the recent Wisconsin Glaciation, shaped by the subsequent rise in sea level. The low ridge across the northern section of the island was deposited as glacial moraine during a period of glacial standstill, a period during which till continued to arrive and was deposited as the glacier melted at a stationary front. The southern part of the island is an outwash plain, sloping away from the arc of the moraine and shaped at its margins by the sorting actions and transport of longshore drift. Nantucket became an island when rising sea levels covered the connection with the mainland, about 5,000–6,000 years ago.

The island and adjoining islands of Tuckernuck and Muskeget comprise the Town and County of Nantucket, which is operated as a consolidated town and county government. The main settlement, also called Nantucket, is located at the western end of Nantucket Harbor, where it opens into Nantucket Sound. Key localities on the island include Madaket, Surfside, Polpis, Wauwinet, Miacomet, and Siasconset (generally shortened to "'Sconset").

Climate
According to the Köppen climate classification system, Nantucket features a climate that borders between a Dfb (humid continental climate) and a Cfb (oceanic climate – east half of the island based on the location of the weather station), the latter a climate type rarely found on the east coast of North America and closest to the same by the original classification. Nantucket's climate is heavily influenced by the Atlantic Ocean, which helps moderate temperatures in the town throughout the course of the year. Nantucket receives on average  of precipitation annually, spread relatively evenly throughout the year. Similar to many other cities with an oceanic climate, Nantucket features a large number of cloudy or overcast days, particularly outside the summer months.

Demographics

As of the 2010 United States Census, there were 10,172 people, 4,229 households, and 2,429 families residing in the county. The racial makeup of the county was 87.6% white, 6.8% black, 1.2% Asian, 0.1% American Indian, 2.6% from other races, and 1.8% from two or more races. Those of Hispanic or Latino origin made up 9.4% of the population. In terms of ancestry, 20.9% were English, 18.8% were Irish, 11.5% were American, 10.9% were German, and 6.4% were Italian.

Of the 4,229 households, 28.7% had children under the age of 18 living with them, 44.8% were married couples living together, 8.3% had a female householder with no husband present, 42.6% were non-families, and 29.7% of all households were made up of individuals. The average household size was 2.39 and the average family size was 2.93. The median age was 39.4 years.

The median income for a household in the county was $83,347 and the median income for a family was $129,728. Males had a median income of $82,959 versus $46,577 for females. The per capita income for the county was $53,410. About 3.6% of families and 7.2% of the population were below the poverty line, including 6.9% of those under age 18 and 8.2% of those age 65 or over.

As of the fourth quarter of 2021, the median value of homes in Nantucket County was $1,370,522, an increase of 22.3% from the prior year, and ranked the highest in the US by median home value.

Government

Local
Town and county governments are combined in Nantucket (see List of counties in Massachusetts). Nantucket's elected executive body is its Select Board (name changed in 2018 from Board of Selectmen), which is responsible for the town government's goals and policies. Legislative functions are carried out by an open Town Meeting of the Town's registered voters. It is administered by a town manager, who is responsible for all departments, except for the school, airport and water departments.

State
Nantucket is represented in the Massachusetts House of Representatives by Dylan Fernandes, Democrat, of Woods Hole, who represents Precincts 1, 2, 5 and 6, of Falmouth, in Barnstable County; Chilmark, Edgartown, Aquinnah, Gosnold, Oak Bluffs, Tisbury and West Tisbury, all in Dukes County; and Nantucket. Rep. Fernandes has served since January 4, 2017. Nantucket is represented in the Massachusetts Senate by Julian Cyr, Democrat, of Truro, who has also served since January 4, 2017.

National
Nantucket is in Massachusetts's 9th congressional district, which has existed since 2013. , it was represented in the United States House of Representatives by Bill Keating, a Democrat of Bourne. Massachusetts is currently represented in the United States Senate by senior senator Elizabeth Warren (Democrat) and junior senator Ed Markey (Democrat).

Politics

Party affiliations
In 2019, 55% of Nantucket residents were unaligned with a major political party, 30% were registered Democrats, and 12% were registered Republicans.

*The Commonwealth of Massachusetts allows voters to enroll with a political party or to remain "unenrolled".

Voting patterns
Throughout the late 19th and most of the 20th century, Nantucket was a Republican stronghold in presidential elections. From 1876 to 1984, only two Democrats carried Nantucket: Woodrow Wilson and Lyndon Johnson. Since 1988, however, it has trended Democratic.

Economy

Top employers
According to Nantucket's 2018 Comprehensive Annual Financial Report, the top employers in the town are:

Education 

Nantucket's public school district is Nantucket Public Schools. The Nantucket school system had 1,583 students and 137 teachers in 2017.

Schools on the island include:
 Nantucket Elementary School (public)
 Nantucket Intermediate School (public)
 Cyrus Peirce Middle School (public)
 Nantucket High School (public)
 Nantucket Community School (public, extracurricular)
 Nantucket Lighthouse School (private)
 Nantucket New School (private)

Nantucket Public Schools District information and meetings are broadcast on Nantucket Community Television (Channel 18) in Nantucket.

A major museum association, the Maria Mitchell Association, offers educational programs to the Nantucket Public Schools, as well as the Nantucket Historical Association, though the two are not affiliated.

The University of Massachusetts Boston operates a field station on Nantucket. The Massachusetts College of Art & Design is affiliated with the Nantucket Island School of Design & the Arts, which offers summer courses for teens, youth, postgraduate, and undergraduate programs.

Arts and culture
 Nantucket has several noted museums and galleries, including the Maria Mitchell Association and the Nantucket Whaling Museum.

Nantucket is home to both visual and performing arts. The island has been an art colony since the 1920s, whose artists have come to capture the natural beauty of the island's landscapes and seascapes, including its flora and the fauna. Noted artists who have lived on or painted in Nantucket include Frank Swift Chase and Theodore Robinson. Artist Rodney Charman was commissioned to create a series of paintings depicting the marine history of Nantucket, which were collected in the book Portrait of Nantucket, 1659–1890: The Paintings of Rodney Charman in 1989. Herman Melville based his narrative in Moby Dick on the Nantucket whaling industry.

The island is the site of a number of festivals, including a book festival, wine and food festival, comedy festival, daffodil festival, and a cranberry festival.

Popular culture
Several historical, literary and dramatic works involve people from, or living on, Nantucket. These include:
 Herman Melville's classic Moby-Dick has Ishmael starting his voyage at Nantucket.
 Nathaniel Philbrick's Away Off Shore: Nantucket Island and Its People, 1602–1890.
 Nathaniel Philbrick's In the Heart of the Sea: The Tragedy of the Whaleship Essex
 Poe's The Narrative of Arthur Gordon Pym of Nantucket.
 The science-fiction-based Nantucket series by S. M. Stirling has the island being sent back in time from March 17, 1998, to circa 1250 BC in the Bronze Age.
 Most of the Joan Aiken novel Nightbirds on Nantucket is set on the island.
 The 1971 coming-of-age film Summer of '42 was set in Nantucket.
 The 1986 comedy One Crazy Summer was set in Nantucket and filmed on Cape Cod.
 The 1990s sitcom Wings, which aired eight seasons from 1990 to 1997, was set in Nantucket. The series took place at the fictional "Tom Nevers Field" airport and other locations. It was filmed in LA but all of the establishing shots were filmed at various sites on the island and included fictional versions of real establishments, such as The Club Car restaurant.
 The 2007 comedy The Nanny Diaries has the climax of the film take place at Mr X's Mother's Nantucket oversized Cape-Cod-styled home. Filmed in the Hamptons but made to look like Nantucket.
 The island's name is used as a rhyming device in a noted limerick, beginning "There once was a man from Nantucket..".
 Elin Hilderbrand's novels are set on Nantucket.
 Nantucket is the setting for the Merry Folger series of mystery novels by Francine Mathews.
 American journalist Pam Belluck's 2012 non-fiction book Island Practice follows the misadventures of Nantucket doctor Timothy J. Lepore, MD.
 Andrew Hussie’s 2021 graphic novel Psycholonials takes place in 2020 on Nantucket.
 In the Quentin Tarantino film, Inglourious Basterds, Colonel Hans Landa of the German Nazi Army negotiates a deal where he is awarded a property on Nantucket Island.

Transportation
From 1900 to 1918, Nantucket was one of few jurisdictions in the United States that banned automobiles.

Nantucket can be reached by sea from the mainland by Seastreak, The Steamship Authority, Hy-Line Cruises, or Freedom Cruise Line, or by private boat. A task force was formed in 2002 to consider limiting the number of vehicles on the island, in an effort to combat heavy traffic during the summer months.

Nantucket is served by Nantucket Memorial Airport (IATA airport code ACK), a three-runway airport on the south side of the island. The airport is one of the busiest in Massachusetts and often logs more take-offs and landings on a summer day than Boston's Logan Airport. This is due in part to the large number of private planes used by wealthy summer inhabitants, and in part to the 10-seat Cessna 402s used by several commercial air carriers to serve the island community.

Nantucket Regional Transit Authority operates seasonal island-wide shuttle buses to many destinations including Surfside Beach, Siasconset, and the airport.

Until 1917, Nantucket was served by the narrow-gauge Nantucket Railroad.

Transportation disasters

Nantucket waters were the site of several noted transportation disasters:
 On May 15, 1934, the ocean liner RMS Olympic, sister ship to RMS Titanic, rammed and sank the Nantucket Lightship LV-117 in heavy fog, roughly 45 miles south of Nantucket Island. Four men survived out of a crew of 11.
 On 15 August 1958, Northeast Airlines Flight 258 crashed on approach to Nantucket Memorial Airport, killing 25 of the 34 passengers and crew.
Six days later, on December 21, the wrecked ship broke apart, causing one of the largest oil spills in history.

National Register of Historic Places
The following Nantucket places are listed on the National Register of Historic Places:
 Nantucket Historic District, a National Historic Landmark District (added December 13, 1966); Expanded to encompass the entire island in 1975.
 Brant Point Light Station—Brant Point (added October 28, 1987)
 Jethro Coffin House—a National Historic Landmark, Sunset Hill Road (added December 24, 1968)
 Sankaty Head Light (added November 15, 1987)

Notable people

While many notable people own property or regularly visit the island, the following have been residents of the island:

 William Barnes Sr., attorney and Republican Party political leader
 Eliza Starbuck Barney, abolitionist, genealogist 
 Donick Cary writer, producer
 James H. Cromartie, artist
 A. J. Cronin, novelist
 James A. Folger, founder of the coffee company bearing his name
 Mayhew Folger, whaling captain
 Anna Gardner, abolitionist, poet, teacher
 Robert Moller Gilbreth, businessman, educator, and politician
 Phebe Ann Coffin Hanaford, first woman ordained as a Universalist minister in New England
 Elin Hilderbrand, author 
 Dorcas Honorable, last of the Nantucket Wampanoags
 Pauline Mackay, golfer
 Rowland Hussey Macy, 19th-century retailer, founder of Macy's department store
 Maria Mitchell, astronomer
 Allison Mleczko, ice hockey player
 Raymond Rocco Monto, orthopedic surgeon
 Mary Morrill, grandmother of Benjamin Franklin
 Lucretia Coffin Mott, minister, abolitionist, social reformer, and proponent of women's rights
 Cyrus Peirce, educator
 Nathaniel Philbrick, author
 Joseph Gardner Swift, first graduate of the United States Military Academy
 Nancy Thayer, author
 Meghan Trainor, singer and songwriter
 Charles F. Winslow, physician, 19th-century science author
 Mary A. Brayton Woodbridge, 19th-century temperance reformer, editor

See also 

History
 Essex tragedy
 Nantucket during the American Revolutionary War era
 Nantucket shipbuilding

Culture
 Maria Mitchell Association
 Nantucket Dreamland Foundation
 Nantucket Reds
 Nantucket Historical Association
 The Nantucket Project

Other
 Nantucket Forests
 List of Massachusetts locations by per capita income
 List of National Historic Landmarks in Massachusetts
 National Register of Historic Places listings in Nantucket County, Massachusetts

References

Notes
 Bond, C. Lawrence, Native Names of New England Towns and Villages, privately published by C. Lawrence Bond, Topsfield, Massachusetts, 1991.
 I Once Had a Chum from Nantucket by Drs. Ernest and Convalescence Bidet-Wellville on Neatorama
 Fabrikant, Geraldine, "Old Nantucket Warily Meets the New", New York Times, June 5, 2005
 36 Hours in Nantucket in the New York Times of July 18, 2010

Further reading

External links

 Town of Nantucket website

1641 establishments in Massachusetts
 
County seats in Massachusetts
Coastal islands of Massachusetts
Islands of Nantucket, Massachusetts
Massachusetts counties
 
National Historic Landmarks in Massachusetts
National Register of Historic Places in Nantucket, Massachusetts
Populated coastal places in Massachusetts
Populated places established in 1641
Port cities and towns in Massachusetts
Towns in Massachusetts
Wampanoag